Theta Leonis, Latinized from θ Leonis, formally named Chertan, is a star in the constellation of Leo. With an apparent visual magnitude of +3.324 it is visible to the naked eye and forms one of the brighter stars in the constellation.

Description
This is a large star with 2.5 times the mass of the Sun. The spectrum matches a stellar classification of A2 V, making this a seemingly typical A-type main sequence star. However, the spectrum shows enhanced absorption lines of metals, marking this as a chemically peculiar Am star. The abundance of elements other than hydrogen and helium, what astronomers term the star's metallicity, appears around 12% higher than in the Sun. It is radiating 141 times the luminosity of the Sun from its outer atmosphere at an effective temperature of 9,350 K, literally giving it a white-hot glow.

Theta Leonis is much younger than the Sun, with an estimated age of around 550 million years. Measurements in the infrared band show an excess of emission from the star and its surroundings, suggesting the presence of a circumstellar disk of dust. The temperature of this emission indicates the disk has an orbital radius of 36 AU.

Nomenclature
θ Leonis (Latinised to Theta Leonis) is the star's Bayer designation.

It bore the traditional names Chertan, Chort  and Coxa . In 2016, the International Astronomical Union organized a Working Group on Star Names (WGSN) to catalog and standardize proper names for stars. The WGSN's first bulletin of July 2016 included a table of the first two batches of names approved by the WGSN; which included Chertan for this star.

References

Leo (constellation)
Leonis, Theta
Chertan
A-type main-sequence stars
Leonis, 70
054879
4359
097633
Durchmusterung objects